Elephant Games is an Armenian casual game developing company founded in 2003. Elephant Games currently produces games for PC, Mac, iPad, iPhone, and Android. Most of the company's projects are published by Big Fish Games.

History 
The company started as indie developer White Elephant in 2003. Later the name was changed to Elephant Games. The first released projects were for PC. Through year 2006, the company produced three parts of the arcade top-down shooter RIP. The game was first published by Meridian4  and then distributed as a trilogy bundle on Steam.

In 2007 Elephant Games went on the European market with their fashion simulation game Real Stories: Fashion Shop for Nintendo DS.

Expanding its DS and Wii portfolio the company developed the 2009 action mini-game Love Is... In Bloom based on the Love Is... comic strip by New Zealand born artist Kim Grove.

Elephant Games has also produced hidden-object games. Lost in the City was released in 2009. Others include the Mystery Trackers series that begins with Mystery Trackers: The Void in 2010, Mystery Trackers: Raincliff, and Hallowed Legends: Templar in 2011, and many others.

In 2013 Elephant Games took over two major series previously developed by Big Fish Studios: Mystery Case Files and Haunted Hotel.

In October 2012 the company released its first free-to-play game Found: A Hidden Object Adventure which is available on both PC and iPad. The company's second free-to-play game, Midnight Castle, was released in December 2013.

In 2016, the studio released its first fully self-published game called Just Bones on Steam.

Game Series
Lost in the City
Lost In The City (2009)
Lost In The City: Post Scriptum (2010)

Mystery Trackers
Mystery Trackers: The Void (2010)
Mystery Trackers: Raincliff (2011)
Mystery Trackers: Black Isle (2012)
Mystery Trackers: The Four Aces (2012)
Mystery Trackers: Silent Hollow (2013)
Mystery Trackers: Raincliff’s Phantoms (2014)
Mystery Trackers: Blackrow’s Secret (2014)
Mystery Trackers: Nightsville Horror (2015)
Mystery Trackers: Winterpoint Tragedy (2015)
Mystery Trackers: Paxton Creek Avenger (2016)
Mystery Trackers: Train to Hellswich (2016)
Mystery Trackers: Queen of Hearts (2016)
Mystery Trackers: Memories of Shadowfield (2017)
Mystery Trackers: Mist Over Blackhill (2018)
Mystery Trackers: Darkwater Bay (2018)
Mystery Trackers: The Fall Of Iron Rock (2019)
Mystery Trackers: The Secret of Watch Hill (2019)
Mystery Trackers: Fatal Lesson (2020)
Mystery Trackers: Forgotten Voices (2021)

Grim Tales
Grim Tales: The Bride (2011)
Grim Tales: The Legacy (2012)
Grim Tales: The Wishes (2012)
Grim Tales: The Stone Queen (2013)
Grim Tales: Bloody Mary (2013)
Grim Tales: The Vengeance (2014)
Grim Tales: Color of Fright (2014)
Grim Tales: The Final Suspect (2015)
Grim Tales: Threads of Destiny (2015)
Grim Tales: The Heir (2016)
Grim Tales: Crimson Hollow (2016)
Grim Tales: Graywitch (2017)
Grim Tales: The White Lady (2017)
Grim Tales: The Time Traveler (2018)
Grim Tales: The Hunger (2018)
Grim Tales: The Nomad (2019)
Grim Tales: Guest From The Future (2019)
Grim Tales: The Generous Gift (2020)
Grim Tales: Heritage (2020)
Grim Tales: Trace in Time (2021)
Grim Tales: Echo of the Past (2021)

Hallowed Legends
Hallowed Legends: Samhain (2011)
Hallowed Legends: Templar (2011)
Hallowed Legends: Ship of Bones (2013)

Chimeras
Chimeras: Tune of Revenge (2012)
Chimeras: The Signs of Prophecy (2015)
Chimeras: Cursed And Forgotten (2016)
Chimeras: Mortal Medicine (2016)
Chimeras: Mark of Death (2017)
Chimeras: Blinding Love (2017)
Chimeras: New Rebellion (2018)
Chimeras: Heavenfall Secrets (2018)
Chimeras: Wailing Woods (2019)
Chimeras: Price Of Greed (2019)
Chimeras: Cherished Serpent (2020)
Chimeras: Inhuman Nature (2020)
Chimeras: What Wishes May Come (2021)

Christmas Stories
Christmas Stories: Nutcracker (2012)
Christmas Stories: A Christmas Carol (2013)
Christmas Stories: Hans Christian Andersen’s Tin Soldier (2014)
Christmas Stories: Puss in Boots (2015)
Christmas Stories: The Gift of the Magi (2016)
Christmas Stories: A Little Prince (2017)
Christmas Stories: Alice’s Adventures (2018)
Christmas Stories: Enchanted Express (2019)
Christmas Stories: The Christmas Tree Forest (2020)
Christmas Stories: Yulemen (2021)
Christmas Stories: Taxi of Miracles (2022)

Royal Detective
Royal Detective: The Lord of Statues (2012)
Royal Detective: Queen of Shadows (2014)
Royal Detective: Legend of the Golem (2016)
Royal Detective: Borrowed Life (2017)
Royal Detective: The Princess Returns (2018)
Royal Detective: The Last Charm (2019)

Surface
Surface: Mystery of Another World (2012)
Surface: The Noise She Couldn’t Make (2012)
Surface: The Soaring City (2013)
Surface: The Pantheon (2013)
Surface: Reel Life (2014)
Surface: Game of Gods (2014)
Surface: Alone in the Mist (2015)
Surface: Return to Another World (2015)
Surface: Lost Tales (2016)
Surface: Virtual Detective (2016)
Surface: Strings of Fate (2017)
Surface: Project Dawn (2017)

Death Pages
Death Pages: Ghost Library (2013)

Haunted Hotel
Haunted Hotel: Eclipse (2013)
Haunted Hotel: Ancient Bane (2014)
Haunted Hotel: Death Sentence (2014)
Haunted Hotel: Eternity (2015)
Haunted Hotel: Phoenix (2015)
Haunted Hotel: The X (2015)
Haunted Hotel: The Axiom Butcher (2016)
Haunted Hotel: Silent Waters (2016)
Haunted Hotel: The Thirteenth (2016)
Haunted Hotel: Personal Nightmare (2017)
Haunted Hotel: The Evil Inside (2017)
Haunted Hotel: Lost Dreams (2018)
Haunted Hotel: Beyond the Page (2018)
Haunted Hotel: Room 18 (2019)
Haunted Hotel: Lost Time (2020)
Haunted Hotel: A Past Redeemed (2021)

Mystery Case Files
Mystery Case Files: Fate’s Carnival (2013)
Mystery Case Files: Dire Grove, Sacred Grove (2014)

Riddles of Fate
Riddles Of Fate: Wild Hunt (2013)
Riddles of Fate: Into Oblivion (2014)
Riddles of Fate: Memento Mori (2014)

Midnight Calling
Midnight Calling: Anabel (2015)
Midnight Calling: Jeronimo (2016)
Midnight Calling: Valeria (2017)
Midnight Calling: Wise Dragon (2017)
Midnight Calling: Arabella (2018)

Halloween Stories
Halloween Stories: Invitation (2017)
Halloween Stories: Black Book (2018)
Halloween Stories: Horror Movie (2019)
Halloween Stories: Defying Death (2020)
Halloween Stories: The Neglected Dead (2021)
Halloween Stories: Mark on the Bones (2022)

Detectives United
Detectives United: Origins (2018)
Detectives United: The Darkest Shrine (2019)
Detectives United: Timeless Voyage (2020)
Detectives United: Phantoms of the Past (2021)
Detectives United: Deadly Debt (2022)

Paranormal Files
Paranormal Files: Fellow Traveler (2018)
Paranormal Files: The Tall Man (2018)
Paranormal Files: Enjoy The Shopping (2019)
Paranormal Files: The Hook Man Legend (2019)
Paranormal Files: Trials of Worth (2020)
Paranormal Files: The Trap of Truth (2020)
Paranormal Files: Ghost Chapter (2020)
Paranormal Files: Price of a Secret (2022)

Ms Holmes
Ms Holmes: Monster of Baskervilles (2019)
Ms Holmes: Five Orange Pips (2020)
Ms Holmes: The Adventure of the McKirk Ritual (2021)

Stand Alone Games
Avalon (2006)
Jungle Heart (2006)
Road Rush (2006)
RIP Trilogy (2007)
Bloom (2008)
Real Stories: Fashion Shop (2008)
Love Is... In Bloom (2009)
Wisegal (2009)
Ball Craft (2010)
Masquerade Mysteries: The Case of the Copycat Curator (2010)
Urban Legends: The Maze (2011)
Found: A Hidden Object Adventure (2012)
Detective Quest: The Crystal Slipper (2013)
Midnight Castle (2013)
Unfinished Tales: Illicit Love (2013)
Sir Match-a-Lot (2016)

References

External links 
Official Elephant Games website

Video game development companies